The United States Military Academy (USMA) is a federal service academy located at West Point, New York that educates and commissions officers for the United States Army. The Academy was formally founded in 1802 and graduated its first class in October of the same year. It is the oldest of the five American service academies. Due to the academy's age and its unique purpose of producing Army officers, it is home to many monuments and memorials, the oldest dating back to the early 19th century, shortly after the academy's founding. The oldest monument is the Cadet Monument, dedicated in 1818 and located in the West Point Cemetery, while the newest is the US Grant statue, located across from Battle Monument and dedicated in 2019.

Monuments

References

United States Military Academy
United States Military Academy
Monuments and memorials at West Point